The Stevens rearrangement in organic chemistry is an organic reaction converting quaternary ammonium salts and sulfonium salts to the corresponding amines or sulfides in presence of a strong base in a 1,2-rearrangement.

The reactants can be obtained by alkylation of the corresponding amines and sulfides. The substituent R next the amine methylene bridge is an electron-withdrawing group.

The original 1928 publication by Thomas S. Stevens concerned the reaction of 1-phenyl-2-(N,N-dimethylamino)ethanone with benzyl bromide to the ammonium salt followed by the rearrangement reaction with sodium hydroxide in water to the rearranged amine.

A 1932 publication described the corresponding sulfur reaction.

Reaction mechanism
The reaction mechanism of the Stevens rearrangement is one of the most controversial reaction mechanisms in organic chemistry. Key in the reaction mechanism for the Stevens rearrangement (explained for the nitrogen reaction) is the formation of an ylide after deprotonation of the ammonium salt by a strong base. Deprotonation is aided by electron-withdrawing properties of substituent R. Several reaction modes exist for the actual rearrangement reaction.

A concerted reaction requires an antarafacial reaction mode but since the migrating group displays retention of configuration this mechanism is unlikely.

In an alternative reaction mechanism the N–C bond of the leaving group is homolytically cleaved to form a di-radical pair (3a). In order to explain the observed retention of configuration, the presence of a solvent cage is invoked. Another possibility is the formation of a cation-anion pair (3b), also in a solvent cage.

Scope 
Competing reactions are the Sommelet-Hauser rearrangement and the Hofmann elimination.

In one application a double-Stevens rearrangement expands a cyclophane ring. The ylide is prepared in situ by reaction of the diazo compound ethyl diazomalonate with a sulfide catalyzed by dirhodium tetraacetate in refluxing xylene.

Enzymatic reaction
Recently, γ-butyrobetaine hydroxylase, an enzyme that is involved in the human carnitine biosynthesis pathway, was found to catalyze a C-C bond formation reaction in a fashion analogous to a Stevens type rearrangement. The substrate for the reaction is meldonium.

See also
Sommelet–Hauser rearrangement
γ-Butyrobetaine hydroxylase

References

Rearrangement reactions
Name reactions